BBC Radio 1 Live in Concert is a live album by the Scottish hard rock band Nazareth, recorded for broadcast by the BBC at the Paris Theatre 8 June 1972 (wrongly listed as 5 June on CD) and 17 May 1973

Track listing 
   * 08.06.1972,  Paris Theatre, London

Personnel 
Nazareth 
 Pete Agnew - bass guitar, piano, backing vocals
 Manny Charlton - guitar, backing vocals
 Dan McCafferty - vocals
 Darrell Sweet - drums, percussion, backing vocals
Technical
 Alan Gardner - liner notes
 Jeff Griffin - producer
 Jo Murphy - coordination, compilation

References

External links 

Nazareth (band) live albums
BBC Radio recordings
1972 live albums